Alessandro Celli (born 7 July 1997) is an Italian professional footballer who plays as a centre back for Italian  club Latina.

Career
Born in Latina, Celli started his career in local club Latina Calcio. He was promoted to the first team on 2015–16 season.

He left Latina on 7 July 2017, and signed with Serie C club Fidelis Andria. Celli made his professional debut on 23 September against Catania.

On 24 May 2018, he signed with Pescara. On his first year, he was loaned to Fano in Serie C.

In January 2020, he was loaned to Rieti. On 22 January 2020, Celli played against Ternana of Alessandro Celli.

Forr the 2020–21 season, he was loaned to Virtus Francavilla.

On 13 August 2021, he returned to Latina in Serie C.

References

External links
 

1997 births
Living people
People from Latina, Lazio
Footballers from Lazio
Italian footballers
Association football central defenders
Serie C players
Latina Calcio 1932 players
S.S. Fidelis Andria 1928 players
Delfino Pescara 1936 players
Alma Juventus Fano 1906 players
F.C. Rieti players
Virtus Francavilla Calcio players
Sportspeople from the Province of Latina